The Irish League in season 1948–49 comprised 12 teams, and Linfield won the championship.

League standings

Results

External links
Northern Ireland - List of final tables (RSSSF)

1948–49
1
North